Felipe Guréndez Aldanondo (born 18 November 1975), sometimes known as just Felipe, is a Spanish retired professional footballer. Mainly a defensive midfielder, he could also play as a defensive-minded right back.

He appeared in 146 La Liga games over the course of 11 seasons (three goals), almost exclusively for Athletic Bilbao.

Club career
Born in Vitoria-Gasteiz, Álava, Felipe was a product of Athletic Bilbao's prolific youth system. He made his debut for the first team on 3 January 1996 in a 1–0 home win against Real Zaragoza where he came on as a 46th-minute substitute for Bolo, but was never more than a backup during his nine full La Liga seasons, his best outputs coming from 1998 to 2001; incidentally, as the Basques finished second in 1997–98, he was on loan to Navarrese neighbours CA Osasuna of the second division.

In the summer of 2006, after only 13 matches in his final four years combined, Felipe was released by the Lions and left for CD Numancia also in the second level, contributing relatively in the 2007–08 campaign as the Soria club returned to the top flight after three years of absence. In June 2010, having just totalled 24 league appearances in his last two seasons, the 34-year-old was released and retired shortly after.

Honours

Club
Numancia
Segunda División: 2007–08

International
Spain U21
UEFA European Under-21 Championship: 1998

References

External links

1975 births
Living people
Footballers from Vitoria-Gasteiz
Spanish footballers
Association football defenders
Association football midfielders
Association football utility players
La Liga players
Segunda División players
Segunda División B players
Bilbao Athletic footballers
Athletic Bilbao footballers
CA Osasuna players
CD Numancia players
Spain under-21 international footballers
Spain under-23 international footballers